Financial Street Holding Company Limited is a listed company of the Shenzhen Stock Exchange, which mainly involves in selling and leasing high-end business real estate in Beijing Financial Street area of Beijing, China. Other activities include developing high technology products and the provision of parking services.

It was formerly Chongqing Huaya Modern Paper Work Company Limited which was established in Chongqing in 1996. It changed its name to Financial Street Holding Company Limited in 2000 by backdoor listing from Beijing Financial Street Construction Group. Since 2001, its headquarters has been relocated from Chongqing to Beijing.

See also
Beijing Financial Street
Real estate in China

References

External links
Financial Street Holding Company Limited

Companies listed on the Shenzhen Stock Exchange
1996 establishments in China
Real estate companies established in 1996
Real estate companies of China
Government-owned companies of China
Companies based in Beijing